Annobór-Piaski is a village in east Poland near Lubartów in Gmina Lubartów, Lubartów County in Lublin Voivodeship.

Villages in Lubartów County